Lee Jae-woo (Hangul:  이재우; born 6 September 1992) is a South Korean male badminton player.

Achievements

BWF International Challenge/Series
Men's Doubles

 BWF International Challenge tournament
 BWF International Series tournament
 BWF Future Series tournament

References

External links 
 

1992 births
Living people
South Korean male badminton players